St. Mary's Convent is a very famous girls school in Matara, Sri Lanka

History
The Sisters of Charity of Jesus and Mary came to Galle, Sri Lanka in 1896 for more than 11 years, there was only one house of the SCJM in Galle.  The second foundation was proposed from 1906 especially by M. Tiburce De Mol Superior of Galle.  In collaboration with the Jesuits the sisters, started the work, and by 1908, they finished the convent and the school.  on 15 April 1908 Sr. Josephine Halewijn and Sr. Livine Van Brabant left for Matara with four orphans in order to make last minutes arrangements.  Fr. Van Antwerpen S. J. the parish priest. but all student are chatar

The remaining sisters and about ten orphans arrived on Easter (19 April)

The official dedication was to take place on Monday, but due to a heavy storm the ceremony was postponed until the following day. Joseph Van Reeth, Bishop of Galle, blessed the new convent, and put it under the patronage of Mary Immaculate.

The first community consisted of six sisters. Mother Armand Landtmeters, Sr. Winefred Cahill, and Sr. Honor Philbin and Sr. Josephine, Sr. Wilmer Walker, and Sr. Livine Van Brabant.

The original group of six sisters did not remain together for a long time. Already in 1910, Sr. Wilmer left for Kegalle to take up the management of the school. in the same year two new sisters arrived in Matara from Europe.

The first superior, Sr. Armand, had to return to Belgium in 1913 because of health problems. She was succeeded by M. Ursmer Van Massenhove, who had been already in Matara for a few years. During her superiorate the buildings of Matara were expanded, and the school acquired and excellent reputation.

The original buildings were specially designed for the sisters as convent and school. The architect was Father Roelandt, s.j. When the sisters arrived in 1908, the convent and the school were finished. According to eyewitnesses, they were spacious and beautiful buildings. The orphanage was opened for use on 17 June 1908.

Already in 1912 Ghent gave its permission to enlarge the complex. All the rooms were overcrowded and still the sisters had to refuse some children. By the end of 1913, the new buildings were inaugurated : a large dormitory and a big festive hall, that was however used as school for lace-making from the beginning.
1915 : Industrial school turned into an orphanage. The large hall is used as
refectory, gymnastics room, classroom, and at first even as dormitory. The former dormitory of the orphans was used from then on by the small boys, who were boarders.

1919 : Purchase of a piece of land, adjacent to their property. Building of a
dormitory. The sanitary facilities and the kitchen were improved, and a big room for the Oblate Sisters was arranged.

1920 : New building for the boarders and enlargement of the dormitory,
with adjacent verandah.

1921 : Inauguration of the grotto and the statue of Our Lady of Lourdes.

1926 : Blessing of the new classrooms and the new dormitory.

1927 : Blessing of the new orphanage and the new infirmary.

1930 : Occupation of 6 new classrooms.

1936 : Blessing of the new wing by the Bishop.

1937 : Demolition of the old convent. The big chapel is built.
The school started on 1 May 1908. There were 20 pupils in the English school. Besides some general classes, they also taught music and embroidery to the older girls and t women. In 1910 the English school was already recognized by the State, which was important in order to qualify for subsidies.

In 1913, the Marian congregation was established for the pupils of the English school.

The number of boarders was rather high. At the beginning of the First World War there were 82 boarders. Their number decreased during the war, which brought about financial difficulties for the sisters.

They were forced, among other things, to refuse some orphans. After the war everything landed on its feet, and in the twenties there were more than 100 boarders.

There was also a “Cambridge Class, where pupils were prepared for entrance examinations for the Cambridge University in England.

In 1929, a Kindergarten was opened, allied to the English school.

The school started on 1 May 1908 with about 100 pupils, of whom 60 followed regular classes. The Sinhalese school and orphanage were recognized in 911 as “Boarding School by the State inspection. This was rather unusual. A special grant was attached to it. In 1911, the Sinhalese school was enlarged with a 6th form, a 7th and 8th year because two teachers of the school had passed their exams for this highest level.

From 1923 on wards, a kindergarten was also attached to the Sinhalese school.

The institute is now one of the most important schools in the region.

The school for lace- making opened its doors on 1 June 1908. the orphans formed the core, but soon many local children came to the industrial school as well. Several times the pupils obtained marvelous prizes on exhibitions of lacework.

Girls' schools in Sri Lanka